Candi Lindsey (born June 9, 1972), better known by her stage name Blue Raspberry, is an American singer from Pleasantville, New Jersey. She is perhaps best known for her affiliation with East Coast hip hop group Wu-Tang Clan. Her moniker was given to her by fellow Wu-Tang affiliate Killah Priest, who said she reminded him of a blue raspberry.

Biography
She was discovered by the Wu-Tang Clan at Bally's Atlantic City, where she was working as a parking cashier at a convention and was overheard while singing over the loudspeakers. Blue Raspberry emerged as the group's in-house female vocalist during the first round of Wu-Tang solo projects.  She added vocals to tracks on Method Man's Tical and Raekwon's Only Built 4 Cuban Linx, but seemed to have her position somewhat usurped by Tekitha on the Clan's second album Wu-Tang Forever.  Nevertheless, she has continued to appear on Wu projects including Method Man & Redman's Blackout! and the Ghost Dog soundtrack. A solo album was in the works for 1999 and is known to have been completed but it was not released. Blue Raspberry finally debuted as a solo artist in 2005, releasing the album Out of the Blue through the website Chambermusik.com. She made an appearance on Raekwon's Only Built 4 Cuban Linx... Pt. II album.

Discography

Albums
Out of the Blue (2005, Chamber Musik)

Appearances

References 

1972 births
Living people
Wu-Tang Clan affiliates
American hip hop singers
American soul singers
American contemporary R&B singers
Singers from New Jersey
People from Pleasantville, New Jersey
African-American women singers
21st-century American women singers